A Plasma-assisted slow-wave oscillator (Pasotron) is a directed energy device that produces high-power, long-pulse microwave energy. Because the device does not require any externally-produced magnetic fields to confine the electron beam used to generate the microwaves, it can be constructed to be smaller and lighter than other high-power microwave sources.  In the early 1990s, pasotrons began to be considered as a possible directed energy weapon applicable to missile defense, radio jamming and other military uses.

References 
 Dan M. Goebel, Elmira S. Ponti, Jon R. Feicht, Ron M. Watkins, "PASOTRON high-power microwave source performance", Proc. SPIE 2843, p. 69-78, Intense Microwave Pulses IV.
 A. G. Shkvarunets, et al, "Progress in Pasotron development", HIGH ENERGY DENSITY AND HIGH POWER RF: 6th Workshop on High Energy Density and High Power RF. AIP Conference Proceedings, Volume 691, (2003) pp. 300-300.
 J. M. Butler, D. M. Goebel, J. Santoru, "Pasotron Technology", 1994 report from Hughes Research Laboratories

Microwave technology